Siah Duleh (also Romanized as Sīāh Dūleh; also known as Sīāh Daleh) is a village in Sheykh Neshin Rural District, Shanderman District, Masal County, Gilan Province, Iran. At the 2006 census, its population was 520, in 141 families.

References 

Populated places in Masal County